was a weekly Japanese men's magazine published by Heibon Shuppan (currently known as Magazine House).  It was first published on April 28, 1964, and continued until 1988. The magazine featured articles on lifestyle, fashion, sports, political issues, and sex, rivaling with Weekly Playboy, launched two years later.

Heibon Punch was influential in promoting American fashion trends, such as the Ivy look, to Japanese male youth in post-World War II Japan.

Some of Heibon Punch collaborators were Yukio Mishima, Toshio Saeki, and Kyoko Okazaki.

Other magazines by the same publisher were Monthly Heibon Punch, the general weekly magazine Weekly Heibon, and the spin-off Heibon Punch for Girls (precursor to an an).

References

1964 establishments in Japan
1988 disestablishments in Japan
Defunct magazines published in Japan
Magazines disestablished in 1988
Magazines established in 1964
Magazines published in Tokyo
Men's magazines published in Japan
Weekly magazines published in Japan